Gannicus was a Celtic slave, who together with the Thracian Spartacus, Crixus, Castus and Oenomaus, became one of the leaders of rebel slaves during the Third Servile War (73–71 BC). In the winter of 71 BC, Gannicus, along with Castus, broke off from Spartacus, taking a large number of Celts and Germans with them, marking the second detachment  of the rebellion. Gannicus and Castus met their end at the Battle of Cantenna in Lucania near Mount Soprano (Mount Camalatrum), where Marcus Licinius Crassus, Lucius Pomptinus and Quintus Marcius Rufus entrenched their forces in battle and defeated them.

In popular culture
Gannicus was portrayed in a minor role by Paul Lambert in the 1960 film Spartacus, directed by Stanley Kubrick.
Gannicus is portrayed by Dustin Clare in the Starz television series Spartacus: Gods of the Arena and sequels Spartacus: Vengeance and Spartacus: War of the Damned. This version of Gannicus is based on WWE professional wrestler Shawn Michaels. He is depicted as a freed former gladiator, from the House of Batiatus, who agrees to join Spartacus' cause to honor his friend Oenomaus after he falls in the rebellion.
Gannicus was portrayed by Paul Telfer in the 2004 miniseries Spartacus – He commands the rebel cavalry. In the miniseries, he is portrayed as a Thracian.

References

Ancient sources
 Titus Livius, Periochae zu Buch 97.
 Plutarch, Crassus 11, 2–3.
 Frontin 2, 4, 7; 2, 5, 34.

Secondary literature
 
 
 

1st-century BC Romans
Celtic warriors
Gaulish people
Rebel slaves in ancient Rome
Roman gladiators
Third Servile War
71 BC deaths
Year of birth unknown
Spartacus